Hind Al-Abadleh is a professor of chemistry at Wilfrid Laurier University in Waterloo, Ontario, Canada. She studies the physical chemistry of environmental interfaces, aerosols and climate change.

Early life and education 
Al-Abadleh grew up in the United Arab Emirates, where she became interested in chemistry during high school. She was excited that science could be used to protect the environment. She eventually studied chemistry at the United Arab Emirates University, graduating in 1999. She joined the University of Iowa in 1999 for her doctoral studies, earning her PhD in 2003. She was awarded the University of Iowa Dissertation Prize in Mathematics, Physical Sciences and Engineering.

Research 
She moved to Northwestern University for a postdoctoral scholarship working with Franz Geiger. Whilst she loved Iowa, 9/11 made America a hostile climate for Muslim women (and men). She was appointed to the Department of Chemistry at Wilfrid Laurier University as an Assistant Professor in 2005 and was eventually promoted to Full Professor. She was awarded a Research Corporation Cottrell College Science Award to study the surface interactions of organoarsenical compounds with geosorbents spectroscopically. Al-Abadleh holds adjunct professor appointment at the University of Waterloo.  She also was a visiting professor at the University of Toronto and Trent University (as the Inaugural Ray March Visiting Professor). The 2008 Petro-Canada award allowed her to study organic arsenic in soil and water. Her research has been supported by the American Chemical Society, Ontario's Ministry of Research and Innovation, Imperial Oil and Canadian Foundation for Climate and Atmospheric Sciences. She is studying the ageing of aerosols using computational chemistry, mathematical modelling and spectroscopy. She gave a talk at 2014 TEDx Laurier University, To Dream and To Act. In 2015 she published a study showing that aqueous phases reactions of guaiacol and catechol with iron leads to the formation of secondary colored particles. This study highlighted additional pathways for particle growth in the atmosphere in addition to particle nucleation and growth from gas phase precursors.

In 2018 she was named the Fulbright Canada Research Chair in Climate Change, and will work at University of California, Irvine, for 2019. This position allowed her to teach a course on environmental catalysis and conduct research on multiphase chemistry in atmospheric aerosols catalyzed by metals. She is also a board member of Nano Ontario.

Bibliography 

 FT-IR Study of Water Adsorption on Aluminum Oxide Surfaces 
 Surface Water Structure and Hygroscopic Properties of Light Absorbing Secondary Organic Polymers of Atmospheric Relevance 
 Efficient Formation of Light-Absorbing Polymeric Nanoparticles from the Reaction of Soluble Fe(III) with C4 and C6 Dicarboxylic Acids
 ATR-FTIR and Flow Microcalorimetry Studies on the Initial Binding Kinetics of Arsenicals at the Organic–Hematite Interface \
 Density functional theory calculations on the adsorption of monomethylarsonic acid onto hydrated iron (oxyhydr)oxide clusters 
 Dispersion Effects on the Thermodynamics and Transition States of Dimethylarsinic Acid Adsorption on Hydrated Iron (Oxyhydr)oxide Clusters from Density Functional Theory Calculations

Awards 
 2018 Wilfrid Laurier University Faculty Association Merit Award 
 2018 Environmental Science Leader of the Society of Environmental Toxicology and Chemistry 
 2017 Kitchener-Waterloo Coalition of Muslim Women Women Who Inspire Award 
 2016 Canadian Arab Institute in Toronto Canadian Arab to Watch
 2016 Muslim Awards for Excellence (MAX) Platinum Award of Excellence 
 2016 Wilfrid Laurier University Faculty Association Merit Award 
 2012 Wilfrid Laurier University Faculty Association Merit Award 
 2008 Petro-Canada Young Innovator Award

References 

Year of birth missing (living people)
Living people
Emirati women scientists
University of Iowa alumni
Emirati chemists
Academic staff of Wilfrid Laurier University
Environmental scientists